Paradiscopus maculatus is a species of beetle in the family Cerambycidae, and the only species in the genus Paradiscopus. It was described by Schwarzer in 1930.

References

Acanthoderini
Beetles described in 1930
Monotypic beetle genera